The Nortex Regional Planning Commission (NORTEX) is a voluntary association of cities, counties and special districts in North Texas.

Based in Wichita Falls, the Nortex Regional Planning Commission is a member of the Texas Association of Regional Councils.

Counties served

Largest cities in the region
Wichita Falls
Vernon
Burkburnett
Graham
Iowa Park
Bowie
Jacksboro

References

External links
Nortex Regional Planning Commission - Official site.

Texas Association of Regional Councils